Jimmy Carter Kleinsasser (born January 31, 1977) is a former American Football player who played fullback, H-back, and tight end for the Minnesota Vikings of the National Football League. He played college football at North Dakota and played for the Vikings his entire career since being drafted in 1999.

Football career

High school
Jimmy Kleinsasser attended Carrington High School in Carrington, North Dakota and was a letterman and a standout in football, basketball, and track & field. In football, he was a two time All-Region honoree and All-State honoree, and was twice named the Gatorade Circle of Champions North Dakota Player of the Year.  At Carrington High School, Kleinsasser was a starter on the 1995 Class B State Championship basketball team.  In track, he has the N.D. Class B State T&F Meet records for shot put (62 ft, 2 in) and discus throw (183 ft, 11 in).

College
Kleinsasser attended the University of North Dakota and played for the North Dakota Fighting Sioux football team from 1995 to 1998 before being drafted by the Minnesota Vikings in 1999. North Dakota was a Division II school at the time. At North Dakota, Kleinsasser was a four-time first-team All-North Central Conference (NCC) pick and in 1998 was the only Division II football player selected as a Gannett News Service All-American. In 1998, Kleinsasser had 45 receptions for 710 yards and 86 rushing yards.

Minnesota Vikings
Kleinsasser was drafted as a tight end in the second round of the 1999 NFL Draft.  He demonstrated remarkable durability throughout his career, playing in all 16 games up to 2010, except for missing 15 games because of an knee injury in 2004.

In 2007 and 2008 Kleinsasser was named to USA Today All Joe Team honoring hard workers and under-recognized players. He continued his 13-year career with the Vikings in the 2011 season.  He ranked 2nd in team history for starts made by a TE with 119, and ranked 4th in catches by a TE in Vikings history. His blocking skills also paved the way for 7 of the top 8 single-season rushing marks in Vikings history, including Adrian Peterson's then team record and NFL leading 1,760 yds in 2008. Kleinsasser retired at the end of the 2011 NFL season after 13 seasons with the Vikings.

In popular culture
In the movie 50 First Dates, Kleinsasser is mentioned by Sean Astin's character briefly before Kleinsasser scores a touchdown on the TV.

References

1977 births
Living people
American football tight ends
Minnesota Vikings players
North Dakota Fighting Hawks football players
North Dakota Fighting Hawks men's basketball players
People from Foster County, North Dakota
Players of American football from North Dakota
American men's basketball players